Nani Wartabone (30 April 1907 – 3 January 1986) was an Indonesian politician and nationalist from Gorontalo. He was declared a National Hero of Indonesia by President Megawati Sukarnoputri on 6 November 2003. Wartabone became involved with social work as secretary of the Jong Gorontalo in Surabaya in 1923. Five years later, he became chairman of the Gorontalo branch of the Indonesian National Party (PNI). He declared "Indonesia's independence" on 23 January 1942, three years before the proclamation of Indonesian independence on 17 August 1945. After independence, he was part of the forces which ended the Permesta revolt of several army officers in 1958.

References 

 

National Heroes of Indonesia
1907 births
1986 deaths
Politicians from Gorontalo (province)